Nakafutō Station is the name of two train stations in Japan:

 Nakafutō Station (Hyōgo) (中埠頭駅)
 Nakafutō Station (Osaka) (中ふ頭駅)